The Grote Prijs Stad Eeklo is a cyclo-cross race in Eeklo, Belgium organised since 1996 by Wielerclub Sportvrienden Eeklo.

Results

References

External links
 
 Cycling Archives

Cycle races in Belgium
Cyclo-cross races
Recurring sporting events established in 1996
1996 establishments in Belgium
Sport in East Flanders
Eeklo